The European qualification for the 2012 Women's Olympic Volleyball Tournament is held from 27 April 2011 to 6 May 2012.

Elimination round
All times are local.
In case of a 1–1 tie, teams play a Golden Set to determine the winner.

  won the golden set 15–13.

First leg

Second leg

Pre-qualification tournaments

Tournament 1
Venue:  Yantarny Sports Palace, Kaliningrad, Russia
Dates: 9–13 November 2011

Preliminary round

Pool A

Pool B

Knockout round

Semifinals

Final

Tournament 2
Venue:  Žatika Sport Centre, Poreč, Croatia
Dates: 9–13 November 2011

Preliminary round

Pool A

Pool B

Knockout round

Semifinals

Final

Tournament 3
Venue:  Sports Games Palace, Baku, Azerbaijan
Dates: 9–13 November 2011

Preliminary round

Pool A

Pool B

Knockout round

Semifinals

Final

Qualification tournament
Venue:  Başkent Volleyball Hall, Ankara, Turkey
Dates: May 1–6, 2012
All times are Eastern European Summer Time (UTC+03:00).

Pool A

Pool B

Final round

Bracket

Semifinals

Final

Final standing

Individual awards

Best Scorer

Best Spiker

Best Blocker

Best Server

Best Setter

Best Receiver

External links
Official website of the European Qualification Tournament

Olympic Qualification Women Europe
Olympic Qualification Women Europe
Volleyball qualification for the 2012 Summer Olympics
2012 in women's volleyball
Vol